Eunidia fuscomarmorata is a species of beetle in the family Cerambycidae. It was described by Stephan von Breuning in 1962. The species primary range is in Kenya.

References

Eunidiini
Beetles described in 1962